This page is a list of 2017 UCI WorldTeams and riders. These teams are competing in the 2017 UCI World Tour.

Teams overview 
The 18 WorldTeams in 2017 are:

Riders





































See also 

 2017 in men's road cycling
 List of 2017 UCI Professional Continental and Continental teams
 List of 2017 UCI Women's Teams

References 

2017 in men's road cycling
2017